Zalian District is a district (bakhsh) in Shazand County, Markazi Province, Iran. At the 2006 census, its population was 42,665, in 11,108 families.  The District has two cities: Tureh & Mahajeran. The District has three rural districts (dehestan): Nahr-e Mian Rural District, Pol-e Doab Rural District, and Zalian Rural District.

References 

Shazand County
Districts of Markazi Province